Pushchino Radio Astronomy Observatory is a Russian (former Soviet) radio astronomy observatory. It was developed by Lebedev Physical Institute (LPI), Russian Academy of Sciences within a span of twenty years. It was founded on April 11, 1956, and currently occupies  70 000 square meters.

Radio astronomy in Russia
Historically, Russian radio astronomy (formerly Soviet) has had a permanent and stable connection with the P N Lebedev Physical Institute (LPI)  of the Russian Academy of Sciences. The institute had both permanent stations and conducted expeditions to  locations in the field  in the Crimea region. These facilities, and expeditions were designed for research in radio astronomy beginning in the late 1940s.

A decade later the center for radio astronomy research had gravitated to the southern Moscow region (about 75 miles south of Moscow), in Pushchino (informally called Pushchino-on-Oka). Here a new observatory,  the Pushchino Radio Astronomy Observatory was developed within twenty years as part of the  LPI Astro Space Center. It has become one of  the largest radio astronomy observatories in Russia and in the world (2001). It was founded in April, 11th, 1956 under the purview of the Academy of Sciences of the USSR.

History of equipment in use
The Pushchino Radio Astronomy Observatory has four notable radio telescopes (RT 22), each with mirrors at 22 meters. Constructed in 1959 these are fully steerable, and are designed to operate in millimeter and centimeter ranges of wavelength. The DKR 1000 has arms that are 40 by 1000 meters. In 1973, another telescope was added to this set. The nomenclature is "Large Phased Array" with the designation BSA/LPI, operating in the meter wavelength range. The DKR 1000 and BSA/LPI, are currently the largest radio telescopes in the world, which operate in the meter range.

Research divisions
The Observatory employs 45 researchers along with 60 engineers and technicians to accomplish staff the several major departments and several labs of the observatory. These are combined with 80 other people who perform administrative duties, workshops, garage, and a staff of guards. 
The departments and labs are designed to focus on scientific and technical aspects of observatory sciences.

The departments are as follows: Plasma astrophysics, Extragalactic radio astronomy, Pulsar physics, Space radio spectroscopy,  and  Pulsar astrometry. The laboratories are as follows: Radio astronomy equipment, Automation radio astronomy research, Computer engineering and information technology, and Radio telescopes of the meter wavelength range.

Main areas of research

radio astronomy for astrophysics
molecular clouds physics
space masers
giant atoms in space
star formation processes (research and investigation)
physical conditions in the diffuse interstellar medium
supernova remnants and the interstellar medium
radio emission of radio galaxies and quasars
interplanetary plasma and solar wind investigations
how perturbations propagate in the interplanetary plasma is studied
Northern hemispheric isotope construction
catalogue of radio sources
active galactic nuclei are studied
very large baseline interferometry (VLBI)
pulsars physics which are neutron stars
pulsar radio emission is studied in the context of microstructure of pulse and the mechanism involved.
establish  pulsar time scale by timing of pulsars.

Outstanding achievements
Alfven waves energy flow at 10 solar radii,
establish the existence of a planet near pulsar PSR B0329+54,
catalogue the spectra of 336 pulsars, discovery of a radio pulsar 102 MHz while observing X-ray radio source Geminga,
another radio pulsar discovered as the source of SGR 1900+14
an interplanetary scintillating method accomplishes a successful survey of compact radio sources.

See also
 University of California High-Performance AstroComputing Center

References

External links

Pictures of the Pushchino Radio Astronomy Observatory, along with some information.
English Russia photo set with some descriptions
Physics Upsekhi page for article

General references
Book chapters:

 
Book citation: Sources and Scintillations: Refraction and Scattering in Radio Astronomy. Edited by Richard Strom, Peng Bo, Mark Walker, and Nan Rendong. IAU Colloquium 182.  Kluwer Academic Publishers, Dordrecht.
Reprinted from Astrophysics and Space Science, Volume 278 (1-2), 2001, p. 255.

Astronomical observatories in Russia
Radio telescopes
Astronomical observatories built in the Soviet Union
1956 establishments in the Soviet Union